Mis'ry and the Blues is an album by trombonist/vocalist Jack Teagarden recorded in Chicago in 1961 and released by the Verve label.

Reception

Allmusic awarded the album 4 stars with Scott Yanow stating "Trombonist Jack Teagarden's Verve recordings, his last batch of studio sides, have tended to be underrated. Teagarden was actually still in prime form up until the time of his unexpected death in early 1964 ... Whether taking trombone solos or singing, Teagarden sounds inspired by the fresh material throughout".

Track listing 
 "Don't Tell a Man About His Woman" (Willard Robison) – 2:57
 "Basin Street Blues" (Spencer Williams) – 5:11
 "Froggie Moore" (Jelly Roll Morton, Reb Spikes, John Spikes) – 2:53
 "I Don't Want to Miss Mississippi" (Seger Ellis) – 4:18
 "It's All in Your Mind" (Charlie LaVere) – 4:34
 "Mis'ry and the Blues" (Charlie LaVere) – 5:22
 "Original Dixieland One-Step" (Original Dixieland Jazz Band) – 5:00
 "Love Lies" (Terry Shand) – 3:26
 "Afternoon in August" (Bill Stegmeyer) – 3:25
 "Peaceful Valley" (Robison) – 2:44

Personnel 
Jack Teagarden – trombone, vocals
Don Goldie – trumpet
Henry Cuesta – clarinet
Don Ewell – piano
Stan Puls – bass
Ronnie Greb – drums
Charlie LaVere (tracks 1, 5, 6 & 8), Sid Feller (track 4), Bill Stegmeyer (track 9) – arranger
Shay Torrent – organ (track 8)

References 

1961 albums
Jack Teagarden albums
Albums produced by Creed Taylor
Verve Records albums